ToyMakerz is an American reality television series featuring David Ankin from Reidsville, North Carolina-based company ToyMakerz LLC as they show their process of building and modifying custom vehicles. The show premiered in 2016 on Velocity and has aired three seasons. ToyMakerz is on The History Channel and FYI.

In each episode, David Ankin and his team design and build motorized creations. Notable works include GPS, a three-quarter scale chain-driven car, the "Beast", a mid-engine formula car and winner of the Magnaflow People's Choice Award at SEMA in Las Vegas in 2017, a four-foot racing drone, and a street-legal dragster. Guest appearances include NASCAR driver Richard Petty, actor Dean Cain, and drag racer Sarah Edwards.

Series Overview

Episodes

Season 1 
The first season of the American automotive cable television series ToyMakerz began airing on Velocity in the United States on September 16, 2016, until November 18, 2016 for eight episodes. The series stars David Ankin.

Season 2 
The second season of ToyMakerz aired November 10, 2017 and ran until January 12, 2018 on Velocity. It featured eight parts.

Season 3 
The third season aired March 2019 on The History Channel and FYI.

References

External links 
 

2016 American television series debuts